Decisive Battles is a 2004 American animated documentary television series that depicted historic conflicts using the game engine from Rome: Total War to present 3-D simulations of the battles. The show was hosted by Matthew Settle, who usually traveled to the sites of the battles. It originally aired on Fridays on the History Channel, and ran for thirteen episodes in mid-2004. Reruns of the show air on the History International channel and the Military History channel.

Battles

See also 
 Time Commanders
 The Fifteen Decisive Battles of the World

References

External links
 

2004 American television series debuts
2004 American television series endings
2000s American adult animated television series
2000s American documentary television series
Documentary television series about war
History (American TV channel) original programming
Machinima works